Hexastylis or heartleaf is a segregate of the genus Asarum, in the family Aristolochiaceae. The group comprises ten species endemic to southeastern North America. It is a perennial, evergreen, herbaceous plant with leaves and flowers arising directly from the rhizomes.

Species 
There are eighteen species of Hexastylis:

 Hexastylis arifolia
 Hexastylis callifolia
 Hexastylis chueyi
 Hexastylis contracta
 Hexastylis finzelii
 Hexastylis harperi
 Hexastylis heterophylla
 Hexastylis lewisii
 Hexastylis minor
 Hexastylis naniflora
 Hexastylis rhombiformis
 Hexastylis rollinsiae
 Hexastylis rosei
 Hexastylis ruthii
 Hexastylis shuttleworthii
 Hexastylis sorriei
 Hexastylis speciosa
 Hexastylis virginica

References

Piperales genera
Flora of the Eastern United States
Aristolochiaceae
Taxa named by Constantine Samuel Rafinesque